Sansad TV is an Indian government television channel, which broadcasts the programming of the two Houses of Indian Parliament and other public affairs programming. It was formed in March 2021 by amalgamating the existing house channels, Lok Sabha TV and the Rajya Sabha TV, although separate satellite channels are broadcast for each House.

Provisionally, the channel will have about 35 themes on which programmes will be aired, and the programmes will be similar, but in two languages: Hindi and English. The channel was launched by the Prime Minister of India Narendra Modi, Vice President of India Venkaiah Naidu and Speaker of Lok Sabha Om Birla on 15 September 2021. The TV Channel has experts from diverse fields as guest anchors for some flagship programmes and include Bibek Debroy, Karan Singh, Amitabh Kant, Shashi Tharoor, Vikas Swarup, Priyanka Chaturvedi, Hemant Batra, Maroof Raza and Sanjeev Sanyal.

History
Utpal Kumar Singh, IAS (Retd.)  was given additional charge as the CEO of Sansad TV on 31 August 2022. "During the intersession period and beyond the working hours of Parliament, both will telecast common content to a large extent. The LSTV platform would telecast programmes in Hindi, while RSTV would do so in English. The two language variants, it was felt, enables better branding and increased viewership", a top official said. "The attempt is to go beyond the proceedings of the Houses and show the functioning of Parliament and parliamentarians when the House is not in session."

See also 
 Lists of television channels in India

References

External links 
 
 
 
 

Legislature broadcasters
Lok Sabha
Rajya Sabha
Television channels in India by language
English-language television shows
Hindi-language television channels in India
Television channels and stations established in 2021
Indian government officials
24-hour television news channels in India
Television networks in India